Loabi Vias is a Maldivian romantic drama web series directed by Mohamed Faisal. Produced by Coco Studio, it stars Nuzuhath Shuaib, Nashidha Mohamed, Mariyam Majudha, Mohamed Faisal and Ahmed Easa in main roles. The pilot episode of the series was released on 26 August 2021.

Cast and characters

Main
 Nuzuhath Shuaib as Zeyba
 Nashidha Mohamed as Athika
 Mariyam Majudha as Saha
 Mohamed Faisal as Wijadh
 Ahmed Easa as Mohamed Maakil
 Ahmed Asim as Fayaz

Recurring
 Fathimath Faina
 Aufa Ibrahim
 Ahmed Shaan
 Mohamed Rifshan as Ramiz
 Aiminath Shamra as Mizna
 Aishath Shifana as Nasiha; Athika's friend
 Abdulla Maaiz Ahmed
 Mohamed Rashaadh

Episodes

Soundtrack

Release and reception
The series was made available for streaming through Baiskoafu on 26 August 2021. Upon release, the series mainly got positive reviews from critics. The series was ranked second position at Baiskoafu Original Chart revealed on 3 December 2021.

References

Serial drama television series
Maldivian television shows
Maldivian web series